The Folkstsaytung ('People's Newspaper') was a Yiddish language daily newspaper which served as the official organ of the General Jewish Labour Bund in Poland. Folkstsaytung was published in Warsaw, Second Polish Republic. It began publication in 1921 and officially lasted until the Nazi invasion of Poland in 1939. Thereafter it continued on as an illegal underground newspaper until 1943. Its first editors were Victor Alter and Henrik Erlich. In 1927 it was renamed Naye Folkstsaytung ("New People's Paper"). When Ehrlich and Alter became preoccupied with their leadership responsibilities in the Bund, Leyvik Hodes took over editorial responsibility. <Leyvik Hodes: Biografye un shrift. Ed. Sofia Dubnov-Erlich.
New York: Farlag undzer tsayt, 1962> It began to be published again after World War II but in 1948 it was taken over by Communist authorities and disbanded.

The newspaper reflected the Jewish secular socialist ideology of the Bund and spoke up for rights of workers, reported on Polish politics and Sejm debates, included articles on cultural and scientific topics, as well as literary works of both Jewish and non-Jewish authors. The newspaper had a women's page Froyen-Vinkl, which was edited by Dina Blond. A young people's edition was published under the title "Kleine Folkststaytung", under the editorship of Leyvik Hodes, who also founded the youth arm of the Bund, SKIF (Jewish Socialist Children's Federation. <Leyvik Hodes: Biografye un shrift. Ed. Sofia Dubnov-Erlich. New York: Farlag undzer tsayt, 1962>

References

General Jewish Labour Bund in Poland
Defunct newspapers published in Poland
Yiddish socialist newspapers
Yiddish-language mass media in Poland
Newspapers established in 1921
Publications disestablished in 1948
1921 establishments in Poland
1948 disestablishments in Poland
Polish underground press in World War II
Daily newspapers published in Poland